Mary Good may refer to:
 Mary L. Good, American inorganic chemist
 Mary Martha Good, member of the Kansas House of Representatives